Robert or Bob Christie may refer to:

Robert Christie (actor) (1913–1996), Canadian actor and director
Robert Christie (footballer) (1865–1918), Scottish football (soccer) player
Robert Christie (Ontario politician), member of the Ontario provincial parliament, 1867–1874
Robert Christie (Lower Canada politician) (1787–1856), historian and political figure from the Gaspé region of Quebec
Robert Christie Jr. (1824–1875), New York politician
Bob Christie (announcer), Scottish TV and radio announcer
Bob Christie (film director), Canadian documentary film director
Bob Christie (politician) (1925–2020), former Australian politician
Bob Christie (racing driver) (1924–2009), American racecar driver